Joseph L. Warren (born May 31, 1952) is an American politician. He is a member of the Mississippi House of Representatives from the 90th District, being first elected in 1979. He is a member of the Democratic party.

References

1952 births
Living people
Democratic Party members of the Mississippi House of Representatives
People from Magee, Mississippi